Tatiana Felixivna Lysenko (born June 23, 1975) is a Soviet and Ukrainian former gymnast, who had her senior competitive career from 1990 to 1994. Lysenko was a member of the Soviet Union team during the early 1990s, a period when its pool of talent was deep (the USSR never lost the women's team competition in the Olympic Games). She is the 1992 Olympic champion on balance beam.

Gymnastics career
Lysenko was born in Kherson, Ukrainian SSR, and has a Ukrainian-Jewish background. She took up gymnastics at the age of seven, and made her senior debut in 1990, winning the all-around competition at the World Cup. Next year she was selected for the world championships in Indianapolis, where she won the team competition. She qualified to the all-around competition, ahead of her talented teammates Oksana Chusovitina, Rozalia Galiyeva and Natalia Kalinina, but fell from beam and did not win any individual medal.

Lysenko's most notable achievements came at the 1992 Summer Olympics in Barcelona. She represented the Unified Team (ex-Soviets) along with Svetlana Boguinskaya, Tatiana Gutsu, Elena Grudneva, Rozalia Galiyeva and Oksana Chusovitina. They won the team title by a comfortable margin. Lysenko finished 7th all-around, but she won the bronze medal in the vault after performing the most difficult vault in the entire competition, a double-twisting Yurchenko (9.912). Lysenko then won the gold in the beam event (9.975).

Unlike many of her Soviet teammates, Lysenko opted to continue after the breakup of the USSR, and represented her native Ukraine at the 1993 World Championships in Birmingham. She won bronze in the all-around, which would have been gold had she not stepped out of the floor. Lysenko was one of only two ex-Soviets on the podium along with Oksana Chusovitina (representing Uzbekistan).

Lysenko continued to compete internationally in 1994. She placed 18th in the all-around at the World Championships in Brisbane. In the event finals, she placed fourth on vault. She retired after the World Championships.

Later life
After retiring from competitions Lysenko moved to the United States and now lives in California. She graduated from the University of San Francisco School of Law and was admitted the California State Bar in 2005. In 2002, she was inducted into the International Jewish Sports Hall of Fame, and in 2016 into the International Gymnastics Hall of Fame. She is married and has a daughter.

Competitive history

Competitor for Ukraine

Competitor for CIS

Competitor for Soviet Union

See also

List of select Jewish gymnasts

References

External links

List of competitive results at Gymn Forum

1975 births
Living people
Sportspeople from Kherson
Soviet female artistic gymnasts
Ukrainian female artistic gymnasts
Olympic gold medalists for the Unified Team
Olympic bronze medalists for the Unified Team
Olympic medalists in gymnastics
Gymnasts at the 1992 Summer Olympics
Medalists at the World Artistic Gymnastics Championships
Jewish Ukrainian sportspeople
Jewish gymnasts
Soviet Jews
Honoured Masters of Sport of the USSR
International Jewish Sports Hall of Fame inductees
Ukrainian women lawyers
21st-century lawyers
Medalists at the 1992 Summer Olympics
21st-century women lawyers